Hessinger Store was a historic general store located at Callicoon Center in Sullivan County, New York. It was built in 1840 and demolished in April 2011.

History
The building was a general store, but also functioned as a post office, dance hall, and hotel / rooming house. It was a large wood-frame building constructed in four phases over a 20 to 50-year period starting about 1840.  It was built of heavy timber, post and beam construction and built into a hillside on a stone foundation.  The largest section was the -story center section.  The second floor of the south wing originally served as a Masonic hall and features a barrel vaulted ceiling.

It was added to the National Register of Historic Places in 2000.

After the Hessingers sold the building, it went through a succession of at least three owners, who failed to keep the building in good repair. Eventually the building became dilapidated and rodent-infested.

In December 2010, the town of Callicoon decided to demolish the building. After a brief court battle the dilapidated building was demolished in April 2011.

References

Commercial buildings on the National Register of Historic Places in New York (state)
Buildings and structures in Sullivan County, New York
National Register of Historic Places in Sullivan County, New York
Demolished buildings and structures in New York (state)
Buildings and structures demolished in 2011